, there were 6,531 electric vehicles registered in Singapore, equivalent to 0.65% of all vehicles in the country. , 8.4% of new cars registered in Singapore were electric.

, the Tesla Model 3 was the best-selling electric car in Singapore.

Government policy
, the Singaporean government offers tax rebates of up to S$45,000 for electric vehicle purchases. , the government offers a 45% rebate on car registration fees for electric cars.

Charging stations
, the government offers rebates for charging station installations equivalent to 50% of the cost of installation, capped at S$4,000.

, there were 2,500 public charging stations in Singapore.

References

Singapore
Road transport in Singapore